is a railway station in the city of Nagano, Japan, operated by the private railway operating company Nagano Electric Railway.

Lines
Kirihara Station is a station on the Nagano Electric Railway Nagano Line and is 3.6 kilometers from the terminus of the line at Nagano Station.

Station layout
The station consists of two opposed ground-level side platforms serving two tracks, connected by a footbridge. The station is staffed.

Platforms

Adjacent stations

History
The station opened on 28 June 1926.

Passenger statistics
In fiscal 2016, the station was used by an average of 914 passengers daily (boarding passengers only).

Surrounding area
Sumitaruho Yoshida Jinja
Kiriharamaki Jinja
Nagano Yoshida High School

See also
 List of railway stations in Japan

References

External links
 

Railway stations in Japan opened in 1926
Railway stations in Nagano Prefecture
Nagano Electric Railway